Douglas Mitchell Pitt (born November 2, 1966) is an American businessman, investor, and philanthropist. He holds the title of "Goodwill Ambassador for the United Republic of Tanzania", an appointment he has held since April 2010. Pitt is the founder of Care To Learn, a US-based domestic charity that funds emergent health, hunger, and hygiene needs for children. His business career started with his founding ServiceWorld Computer Center in April 1991 which merged with TSI Global in July 2013. He acquired this company back in 2017, re-establishing it as Pitt Technology Group. Pitt is also the owner of Pitt Development Group, a firm that specializes in the development of medical office space. A large focus of his work is in East Africa doing water projects as a board member of WorldServe International.

Early life
Douglas was born in St. Louis, Missouri, to Jane Etta (née Hillhouse), a school counselor, and William Alvin Pitt, who ran a trucking firm and is involved in real estate. He has an older brother, the actor Brad Pitt, and a younger sister, Julie Neal. The Pitt siblings all engage in a variety of humanitarian activities in Africa. Pitt attended schools in Springfield, graduating from Kickapoo High School. He graduated from Southwest Missouri State University in 1990. He is married to Lisa and has three children: Landon, Sydney and Reagan.

Business
In 1991, Douglas founded ServiceWorld Computer Center. In November 2007, Douglas sold a 75% interest in ServiceWorld Computer Center to Miami Nations Enterprises, the Indian Tribe of Miami, Oklahoma. Pitt remains an owner and principal operational partner of ServiceWorld. ServiceWorld is a past recipient of the W. Curtis Strube Small Business of the Year and in 2010 was awarded the SBJ Philanthropic Business of the Year. In 2012, Pitt formed TSI Integrated Services in partnership with TSI Global, a St. Louis corporation. In May 2013, the Tribe of Miami purchased a controlling interest in TSI Global. Pitt and the Tribe merged ServiceWorld into TSI Global in July 2013 where Pitt remains an operational member. As part of the technology family, Pitt had formed Nexus Underground in 2012, which provides cloud based services. Nexus Underground was sold by Pitt to the Miami Tribe and merged into TSI Global in August 2013. As a tribal owned entity, MBS and the Miami tribe were recognized in August 2013 as the 8a Business of the Year.

In November 2017, Pitt purchased back his computer company from TSI.  The new entity Pitt Technology Group consists of Nexio Technologies (IT/Networking Services) / LoVo Integrations (Low Voltage, AV, Fiber Optics) / Syndeo Solutions (Cloud Services).  Pitt Technology Group is managed by Kevin Waterland, a principal in the companies. In 2018, PTG acquired ConceptiCode; a specialty software development company.  In early 2019, PTG acquired AVMAN; an audio visual consulting and implementation company originally founded in 2001.

In July 2013, Douglas launched an Innovation and Business Incubation Center in owned retail space in conjunction with the Ozark Chamber of Commerce in Ozark, Missouri. Pitt joined the Board of Directors of Great Southern Bank  in January 2015. Great Southern Bank is traded on the NASDAQ market under the symbol GSBC.

Outside of the technology industry, Pitt is a real estate investor.  His company, PITT DEVELOPMENT GROUP, is a specialty development company in medical/clinical office space with offices in Springfield & St. Louis, Missouri.  PDG holds property and managed properties in Missouri, Kansas, Arkansas & Oklahoma.

Philanthropy
Pitt has served on many boards in Missouri starting with Big Brothers Big Sisters in 1995. Since then, some of the others include Make A Wish; Easter Seals; The Red Cross, and is a past Chairman of the Springfield Area Chamber of Commerce. He has also served on many community task forces including co-chairing the Homeless Task Force in 2010 and serving on the Ready To Learn child project in 2013.

In 2013, Pitt was named to the advisory council of The ONE Organization of Missouri.

Pitt has been an Executive Consultant for Enactus since 2011.  Enactus is an international non-profit with 70,000 active students in 36 countries.  Enactus is a community of student, academic and business leaders committed to using the power of entrepreneurial action to transform lives and shape a better more sustainable world.

Care to Learn
In late 2007, Pitt heard sobering statistics on poverty in Southwest Missouri, including humiliating stories of students in need. The story that particularly bothered him most was one of a fifth-grade boy being teased mercilessly because he had to wear his mom's jeans to school. “I think why it bothers me so much is because it’s so easy to fix,” he says. “And here I couldn’t find that kid. I didn’t know who he was.”

In April 2008, Pitt founded Care to Learn to provide immediate funding to meet the emergent needs of children in the areas of health, hunger, and hygiene so every student can be successful in school. The nonprofit has grown to 38 chapters in partnership with school districts as of July 2021. April 2019 marked the organization's 10th anniversary and 1 Million needs met. On April 22, 2022, Care To Learn celebrated fulfilling 2,000,000 needs. Pitt serves as founder and board member at large, having stepped down In 2017 as president of the board of directors.

Projects in Africa
Pitt first began his International service with Convoy of Hope, doing hunger missions in Budapest and Portugal. He teamed up with WorldServe International in 2005. Pitt is a current board member of WorldServe and helped the organization grow into one of the largest private drilling companies in East Africa, via MajiTech, a Tanzanian wholly owned company of WorldServe. Since Pitt's involvement in 2005, WorldServe has provided clean water to over 2,000,000 Tanzanians. Pitt has worked tirelessly to bring the global challenge of clean water into focus, commenting, "Today 18,000 children will die from preventable diseases like pneumonia or diarrhea simply because they don’t have access to clean water." In 2012, WorldServe brought two drilling rigs online in Kenya serving the refugee crises areas in Dadaab and eastern Kenya. In addition to water wells, WorldServe has also developed numerous medical dispensaries, sanitation buildings and schools. WorldServe expanded drilling into Ethiopia in 2019; an effort co-led by his sister Julie Neal who has two adopted boys from the country.

In July 2010, Pitt was recognized by President of Tanzania, Jakaya Kikwete, in New York City at an event where he was named Tanzania's first ever Goodwill Ambassador for the United Republic of Tanzania. His duties include working with the Ministry of Tourism, Ministry of Water, agriculture, education and wildlife. In 2014, Pitt has partnered with both private and government groups to address anti-poaching measures in Tanzania.

In July 2013, Pitt hosted NFL future Hall of Famer Ray Lewis on his first trip to Tanzania, raising funds for clean water.

In 2016, Waterboys.org was formed.  Featured in an NFL Network commercial, hosted by Matthew McConaughey, the mission to bring life-sustaining well water to east African communities in need was introduced nationally, featuring NFL defensive end, Chris Long. Through the Chris Long Foundation, Long and Pitt launched this initiative to utilize Long's NFL connections to join fellow football players, their fans and their locker rooms to raise money to fund Waterboys  in Africa. In 2017, Waterboys.org ended the year with 31 wells funded and provided clean water to over 100,000 people.

In March 2019, Pitt climbed Kilimanjaro for the third time as part of the Waterboys Conquering Kili 2019 Class which included several veterans along with founder Chris Long and fellow NFL players Haloti Ngata, Beau Allen, Jason Kelce and Rob Ninkovich.  Pitt was also joined by his son, Landon.

Pitt was featured on Endangered Rangers on December 13, 2020 – a live online event hosted by actor Josh Duhamel.  The event was to raise awareness and funding to support African rangers on the front lines protecting wildlife from poaching.  African Community & Conservation Foundation (ACCF) led the event which featured musical guests Dave Matthews and Jordin Sparks and commentary from animal right activist Daymond John of Shark Tank and actor Djimon Hounsou.

Photography
Pitt has been a photographic enthusiast for over 20 years. He has done photo exhibits in galleries in New York, Pennsylvania, California, Minnesota and Missouri, with proceeds going to clean water. His photos have been featured in numerous domestic and international publications.

Commercials
Virgin Mobile. Doug became an ad spokesman for Virgin Mobile Australia, portraying The Second Most Famous Pitt, a parody of his comedic likeness as the brother of actor Brad Pitt. The initial web video went viral and garnered over 1,200,000 YouTube hits in its first week. This campaign became the most successful in history for Virgin Mobile becoming the top 5 viewed online ad in the world in its first month. The campaign won the Grand Prix for Effectiveness at Spikes, a Black Lion at Cannes for Effectiveness, Best of Show at AdFest, the Gold Prize at the 12th Annual Creative Business Idea Awards, two Gold AdFest Awards as well as a Gold & Silver Clio and countless Cannes Lions, AWARD, New York Festivals and many other awards. It was the thirteenth most awarded campaign in 2014. The popularity of the campaign got Pitt a spot on the Today Show with host Matt Lauer. A topic of conversation was his response to conservative comments his mother made about President Obama and gay marriage. He responded with “Moms and dads and kids agree to disagree all over the world, so why would our family be any different? There can be healthy discussion when people disagree with you, and I think there should be. The bad thing is when it turns into venom and negativity and we don’t have that in our family. It’s open discussion. We can learn from each other and, if anything, it solidifies your point or maybe you learn something.”

6IX. In 2019, Pitt parodied the iconic ending of the movie Se7en for Mother’s Brewing Company and a beer named after his likeness called Doin’ Good.  Pitt does a satiric interpretation of his brother Brad's role as Detective David Mills and delivers the movie's most famous line, “What’s in the booooooox?”  The commercial was a promotion of Doin’ Good Orange Wheat Ale, with a portion of the proceeds going to Pitt's charity, Care to Learn.  The video, titled 6ix, is a play on the six-pack that rests in the famous box.  Every carton carries the printed message, DOIN’ GOOD AND FEELIN’ GREAT. Mother’s found inspiration for this beer in Springfield’s famous other brother Doug Pitt, community leader, all-around good guy, and founder of Care to Learn.  People like him remind us that doing a little good goes a long way in building strong communities.  And when you’re doing good, you’re feeling great.  The video was the creation of Locke and Stache and has garnered over 300,000 views on YouTube.

Biking
Pitt is an avid mountain, road, and urban cyclist who supports numerous biking organizations. He also works to promote safe biking lanes; city and mountain bike trail systems; and bike health and safety. Pitt hosts biking fundraisers domestically and internationally.

In January 2011, Pitt became the first American on record to climb Mount Kilimanjaro and descend on a mountain bike. Biking is illegal on Kilimanjaro and permission was granted via the Tanzanian government. The ride was sponsored by Trek Bikes, Eddie Bauer/First Ascent and the Hershey Company. As a fundraiser, the event raised $750,000 for clean water projects in Tanzania. Pitt duplicated this effort in March 2013 hosting a mountain biking trip down Kilimanjaro that netted $250,000 for clean water. An additional $100,000 was raised with sponsors Trek Bikes, Otter Box, Pentair, and Jimmy Johns as Pitt completed the 2012 Leadville 100 Mountain Bike race in Leadville, Colorado—an event he had to complete under the 12-hour deadline to collect the $100,000 for clean water; his time was 10 hours, 22 minutes.

Recognitions
2022 Life360 Community Services Gathering of Heroes – Education Hero Recipient
2020 U.S. Global Leadership Coalition – Mo. Advisory Committee
2019 Missouri Public Affairs Hall of Fame Inductee
2018 TrailSpring Board Member 
2017 Board Member of The Chris Long Foundation 
2016-2022 Biz 417 "Biz 100 Most Influential Business Leaders"
2015 Horace Mann Friend of Education 2015 Award presented by the Missouri NEA 
2015 Ingram Magazine "50 Missourians You Should Know"
2014 Edwin P. Hubble Medal of Initiative 
2013 Missouri ONE Honorary Advisory Committee Member
2012 Missourian Award Recipient
2012, 2013, 2014 Honorary Chairman – St. Louis World Food Day
2011, Doug was honored with the Humanitarian Leadership Award at the Starkey Foundation Gala with fellow honorees President Bill Clinton, Randy Hogan of Pentair and Actress Marlee Matlin.
2011 Springfield Public Schools Hall of Fame Inductee
2011 DAR Excellence in Community Service Award
2010 Goodwill Ambassador for the United Republic of Tanzania
2010 Community Foundation of the Ozarks Humanitarian of the Year
2010 CASA (SW Missouri) Champion for Children
2010 SBJ Philanthropic Business of the Year (ServiceWorld)
2009 Sertoma Service to Mankind Award Recipient
2006 Rotary (Springfield SE) Volunteer of the Year
2003 Gift of Time Recipient – Civic & Community Betterment
2002 Small Business Person of the Year Nominee – U.S. Small Business Administration
2000 Outstanding Young Alumni Award – S. Missouri State University Alumni Association
1999 W. Curtis Strube Small Business of the Year – Springfield, Missouri Chamber of Commerce
1999 Family of the Year – Prevent Child Abuse of Missouri

References

1966 births
Living people
American businesspeople in retailing
American computer businesspeople
American philanthropists
American real estate businesspeople
Businesspeople from Missouri
Missouri State University alumni
Oral Roberts University alumni
Brad Pitt